The women's alpine skiing slalom event was part of the alpine skiing at the 1948 Winter Olympics programme. It was the first appearance of the event. The competition was held on Thursday, February 5, 1948. Twenty-eight alpine skiers from ten nations competed.

Medalists

Results

* 5 seconds penalty added.

References

External links
Official Olympic Report
 

Women's alpine skiing at the 1948 Winter Olympics
Olymp
Alp